Vlatko Glavaš (born 2 September 1962) is a Bosnian politician who is a member of the House of Representatives. He is a member of the Democratic Front.

Glavaš is a former professional football manager and retired player.

Club career
Glavaš started his career at hometown club Iskra Bugojno and played a significant part of his career for clubs in Germany.

International career
Glavaš made his debut for Bosnia and Herzegovina in a September 1996 FIFA World Cup qualification match away against Greece and earned a total of six caps, scoring no goals. His final international was a June 1997 World Cup qualification match against Denmark.

Political career
At the 2018 Bosnian general election, Glavaš entered into politics, getting elected to the national House of Representatives as a member of Željko Komšić's Democratic Front. He was re-elected to the House of Representatives at the 2022 general election.

Honours

Player
Iskra Bugojno 
Yugoslav Second League: 1983–84 (West)
Mitropa Cup: 1984–85

References

External links

1962 births
Living people
People from Bugojno
Association football midfielders
Yugoslav footballers
Bosnia and Herzegovina footballers
Bosnia and Herzegovina international footballers
NK Iskra Bugojno players
Rot-Weiss Essen players
Wuppertaler SV players
Fortuna Düsseldorf players
NK Osijek players
Yugoslav Second League players
Yugoslav First League players
Oberliga (football) players
2. Bundesliga players
Bundesliga players
Regionalliga players
Croatian Football League players
Bosnia and Herzegovina expatriate footballers
Expatriate footballers in Germany
Bosnia and Herzegovina expatriate sportspeople in Germany
Bosnia and Herzegovina football managers
TuRU Düsseldorf managers
FK Olimpik managers
FK Sloboda Tuzla managers
NK Čelik Zenica managers
NK Vinogradar managers
Premier League of Bosnia and Herzegovina managers
Bosnia and Herzegovina expatriate football managers
Expatriate football managers in Germany
Politicians of the Federation of Bosnia and Herzegovina
Democratic Front (Bosnia and Herzegovina) politicians
Members of the House of Representatives (Bosnia and Herzegovina)